Burovdal (also, Bruydal and Buravdal) is a village and municipality in the Ismailli Rayon of Azerbaijan.  It has a population of 204.

References 

Populated places in Ismayilli District